Syracuse is a city in and the county seat of Hamilton County, Kansas, United States.  As of the 2020 census, the population of the city was 1,826.

History
Syracuse began its existence as a stop on the Atchison, Topeka and Santa Fe Railway. The site was originally called Holidayburg or Holliday in honor of Cyrus K. Holliday, first President of the ATSF railway. In 1873 a group of settlers from Syracuse, New York arrived and the site was renamed to Syracuse. In 1886, Syracuse was recognized as the county seat of Hamilton County. Syracuse secured its place in American history on April 5, 1887 by electing an all-woman city council, the first in the nation. The council consisted of Mrs. N. E. Wheeler (mayor), Caroline Johnson Barber, Mrs. W. A. Swartwood, Mrs. S. P. Nott, Mrs. Charles Coe, and Mrs. G. C. Riggles.

By 1912, Syracuse was home to more than a thousand souls, 2 banks, a hotel belonging to the Fred Harvey Company, a flour mill, several machine shops, 2 weekly newspapers (Syracuse Journal and the Republican-News), 4 churches, a county high school with 10 teachers, a telegraph and express office, and an international money order post office.

Geography
Syracuse is located at  (37.982938, -101.751224), along U.S. Route 50 and the Atchison, Topeka and Santa Fe Railway,  sixteen miles (twenty-six kilometers) from the Colorado border. The Arkansas River runs just south of the City of Syracuse. The countryside south of the Arkansas River is marked by sandhills.  Located within these sandhills is the "Syracuse Sand Dunes," a city park covering , including a  fishing pond.

Climate
According to the Köppen Climate Classification system, Syracuse has a semi-arid climate, abbreviated "BSk" on climate maps.

Demographics

2010 census
As of the census of 2010, there were 1,812 people, 715 households, and 460 families living in the city. The racial makeup of the city was 76.7% White, 0.2% African American, 1.8% Native American, 0.2% Asian, 0.1% Pacific Islander, 19.4% from other races, and 1.6% from two or more races. Hispanic or Latino of any race were 32.7% of the population.

There were 715 households, of which 37.1% had children under the age of 18 living with them, 51.6% were married couples living together, 9.0% had a female householder with no husband present, 3.8% had a male householder with no wife present, and 35.7% were non-families. 31.5% of all households were made up of individuals, and 14.3% had someone living alone who was 65 years of age or older. The average household size was 2.53 and the average family size was 3.23.

The median age in the city was 32.1 years. 28.7% of residents were under the age of 18; 9.8% were between the ages of 18 and 24; 25.5% were from 25 to 44; 22.4% were from 45 to 64; and 13.5% were 65 years of age or older. The gender makeup of the city was 50.6% male and 49.4% female.

2000 census
As of the census of 2000, there were 1,824 people, 742 households, and 483 families living in the city. The racial makeup of the city was 79.22% White, 0.71% African American, 0.27% Native American, 0.82% Asian, 17.65% from other races, and 1.32% from two or more races. Hispanic or Latino of any race were 22.42% of the population.

There were 742 households, out of which 33.7% had children under the age of 18 living with them, 53.5% were married couples living together, 7.7% had a female householder with no husband present, and 34.9% were non-families. 32.6% of all households were made up of individuals, and 17.7% had someone living alone who was 65 years of age or older. The average household size was 2.46 and the average family size was 3.13.

In the city, the population was spread out, with 29.2% under the age of 18, 7.6% from 18 to 24, 25.5% from 25 to 44, 20.4% from 45 to 64, and 17.2% who were 65 years of age or older. The median age was 36 years. For every 100 females, there were 95.9 males. For every 100 females age 18 and over, there were 90.7 males.

The median income for a household in the city was $31,250, and the median income for a family was $37,976. Males had a median income of $29,000 versus $23,482 for females. The per capita income for the city was $15,531. About 10.7% of families and 15.0% of the population were below the poverty line, including 20.0% of those under age 18 and 11.6% of those age 65 or over.

Education
Syracuse High School is the unified high school for Hamilton County USD 494. The Syracuse school mascot is Bulldogs.

Gallery

See also
 Santa Fe Trail

References

Further reading

External links

 City of Syracuse
 Syracuse - Directory of Public Officials
 USD 494, local school district
 Syracuse City Map, KDOT

Cities in Kansas
County seats in Kansas
Cities in Hamilton County, Kansas
Kansas populated places on the Arkansas River
1873 establishments in Kansas
Populated places established in 1873